Shamna Kasim. also known by her stage name Poorna, is an Indian actress, dancer and model who appears in Malayalam, Telugu and Tamil films. She made her acting debut in the 2004 Manju Poloru Penkutty.

Early life
Shamna Kasim completed her Bachelor of Arts in English by correspondence. She resides in Kochi, Kerala.

Career

In the mid-2010s, Kasim appeared in a series of films where she portrayed a ghost, with The Hindu labelling her as "the ghost queen of Telugu films". She appeared in Avunu (2012) and the sequel Avunu 2 (2015). She turned down several similar scripts, before acting as a ghost in Raju Gari Gadhi (2015), which became a surprise hit at the box office. She shaved her head completely bald for her role in the Kodiveeran (2017), but the movie did not receive a good response from the audience.

Controversy 
In June 2020, police arrested members of a gang on a complaint lodged by Kasim's mother that they blackmailed her daughter. Police revealed that the gang locked film actresses in hotel rooms and forced them to accompany as escorts for transporting black money.

Filmography

Films

Television

Television shows

References

External links

Indian film actresses
21st-century Indian actresses
Actresses from Kannur
Performers of Indian classical dance
Bharatanatyam exponents
Living people
Year of birth missing (living people)
Actresses in Tamil cinema
Actresses in Telugu cinema
Actresses in Malayalam cinema
Actresses in Kannada cinema
Actresses in Hindi cinema
Actresses in Malayalam television
Actresses in Telugu television
21st-century Indian dancers
Dancers from Kerala